Buchwaldoboletus is a genus of bolete fungi in the family Boletaceae. It was circumscribed by mycologist Albert Pilát in 1969. According to a 2011 survey of the genus, Buchwaldoboletus contains about a dozen species that are saprotrophic and lignicolous.

The genus name of Buchwaldoboletus is in honour of Niels Fabritius Buchwald (1898 - 1986), a Danish botanist and Professor of Phytopathology at a Agriculture College in Copenhagen. It was established by Albert Pilát in 1969, moving Pulveroboletus lignicola to position of the Buchwaldoboletus type species on account of its occurrence on wood (rather than in the ground), decurrent and arcuate pores, the yellow mycelium at the base of the stipe, the blueing flesh and lack of hyphal clamps. Genera Buchwaldoboletus and Chalciporus form the group of fungi that is an early offshoot in the family Boletaceae, whose many members appear to be parasitic.

Species
The genus consists of the following species:

 B. acaulis
 B. brachyspermus
 B. duckeanus
 B. hemichrysus
 B. kivuensis
 B. lignicola
 B. parvulus
 B. pontevedrensis
 B. pseudolignicola
 B. spectabilis
 B. sphaerocephalus
 B. xylophilus

References

External links
 
 
 

Boletaceae
Boletales genera